The Afobaka Dam is an embankment dam with a main gravity dam section on the Suriname River near Afobaka in Brokopondo District of Suriname. The primary purpose of the dam is to generate hydroelectric power and it supports a 180 MW power station. In 1958, Suriname Aluminum Company LLC, a subsidiary of Alcoa, gained an agreement with the Suriname government to build the dam to power an aluminium smelter. Construction began in 1961 and it was completed in 1964. About 75% of power generated is used for processing aluminum, the rest is used in Paramaribo downstream. The power station was operational in 1965 but the very large reservoir, Brokopondo Reservoir, was not completely filled until 1971. Greenhouse gases emitted from the reservoir resulted in poor water quality for decades. Highly acidic water also damaged the power station's turbines.

See also

Gran Olo hydroelectric power plant
Puketi hydroelectric power plant

References

External links

Dams in Suriname
Hydroelectric power stations in Suriname
Brokopondo District
Dams completed in 1964
Energy infrastructure completed in 1965
1965 establishments in Suriname
Embankment dams
Gravity dams